Blat Mogħża Tower, also known as Ta' Capra Tower, was a small watchtower in Fomm ir-Riħ, limits of Mġarr, Malta. It was one of the Lascaris towers.

Blat Mogħża Tower was built sometime during the reign of Giovanni Paolo Lascaris on the site of a medieval watch post. Its design was probably similar to Lippija and Għajn Tuffieħa Towers, which were built in 1637. It would have had Lippija and Nadur Towers in its line of sight.

The tower was built on the edge of a cliff face, which began to subside. According to the Order's engineer Charles François de Mondion, the tower was in ruins by 1730. It was never rebuilt.

References

Lascaris towers
Buildings and structures demolished in the 18th century
Demolished buildings and structures in Malta
Collapsed buildings and structures
Former towers
Mġarr
Military installations closed in the 18th century